Hisako Mizui (born 29 March 1972) is a Japanese badminton player, born in Nara, Nara.

She competed in women's singles and women's doubles at the 1992 Summer Olympics, and in women's singles at the 1996 Summer Olympics in Atlanta. She won a silver medal in women's singles at the 1994 Asian Games.

She is a sister of badminton player Yasuko Mizui.

Achievements

Asian Games 
Women's singles

Asian Championships 
Women's doubles

East Asian Games 

Women’s doubles

IBF World Grand Prix 

The World Badminton Grand Prix sanctioned by International Badminton Federation (IBF) since 1983.

Women's singles

IBF Junior Tournament 

Girls' singles

Girls' doubles

References

External links

1972 births
Living people
People from Nara, Nara
Japanese female badminton players
Olympic badminton players of Japan
Badminton players at the 1992 Summer Olympics
Badminton players at the 1996 Summer Olympics
Asian Games medalists in badminton
Badminton players at the 1990 Asian Games
Badminton players at the 1994 Asian Games
Asian Games silver medalists for Japan
Asian Games bronze medalists for Japan
Medalists at the 1990 Asian Games
Medalists at the 1994 Asian Games